Glenn E. Bradford (born January 31, 1947) is an American politician and lawyer.

Born in Granite City, Illinois, Bradford graduated from Southern Illinois University in 1971 and Emory University in 1974. He was admitted to the Illinois bar in 1974. He practiced law in Glen Carbon, Illinois. Bradford served in the Illinois House of Representatives from January 1997 until his resignation from the Illinois General Assembly in October 1997. He wanted to spend more time practicing law. Bradford was a Democrat.

References

1947 births
Living people
People from Granite City, Illinois
Emory University alumni
Southern Illinois University alumni
Illinois lawyers
Democratic Party members of the Illinois House of Representatives
People from Glen Carbon, Illinois